The women's C-1 200 metres competition at the 2022 ICF Canoe Sprint World Championships in Dartmouth took place on Lake Banook.

Schedule
The schedule is as follows:

Results

Heats
The fastest three boats in each heat advanced directly to the final.
The next four fastest boats in each heat, plus the fastest remaining boat advanced to the semifinal.

Heat 1

Heat 2

Semifinal
The fastest three boats advanced to the final.

Final
Competitors raced for positions 1 to 9, with medals going to the top three.

References

ICF